Nurlan Sairanuly Orazbayev (born June 5, 1968) is a former Kazakh professional ice hockey player, who played for Avtomobilist Karagandy, Bulat Temirtau and Barys Astana. Orazbayev served as a president of the KHL team Barys Astana from  2006 to 2012 and 2013 to 2015.

External links

1968 births
Living people
Sportspeople from Karaganda
Avtomobilist Karagandy players
Barys Nur-Sultan players
Bulat Temirtau players
Kazakhstani ice hockey forwards
Soviet ice hockey forwards